Mandy Wötzel (born 21 July 1973) is a German former pair skater who represented East Germany and later Germany in international competition. With partner Ingo Steuer, she is the 1998 Olympic bronze medalist, the 1997 World champion, the 1995 European champion, and a four-time German national champion.

Personal life 
Mandy Wötzel was born 21 July 1973 in Karl-Marx-Stadt (Chemnitz), Saxony, East Germany. She married an Australian in 2007 and moved the same year to Australia.

Skating career

Early career 

Wötzel began skating as a child. She skated for the club SC Karl-Marx-Stadt, which was renamed to SC Chemnitz after German reunification. Her first partner was Axel Rauschenbach. The pair won the silver medal at the 1989 European Championships. Rauschenbach's skate blade struck Wötzel's head in 1989 while they were performing side-by-side camel spins. She was in hospital for three months and missed half a year of school. Wötzel and Rauschenbach competed at the 1992 Winter Olympics, where they finished 8th. Following the season, Rauschenbach ended their partnership to work at a bank.

Partnership with Steuer 
Ingo Steuer, who had been without a partner during 1991–1992 season, trained at the same rink as Wötzel, and under the same coach, Monika Scheibe. Scheibe initially hesitated to put Wötzel and Steuer together due to doubts about whether their personalities would work well together but she was persuaded after seeing their tryout. After less than a year together, Wötzel/Steuer won the silver medal at the 1993 European Championships and the 1993 World Championships. Both were accepted into the sports division of the German army, supporting athletes.

Wötzel and Steuer had a few accidents during their career. She knocked him out with her elbow while practicing the twist lift and he broke her nose while practicing another lift. During the long program at the 1994 Winter Olympics, Wötzel tripped on a rut and fell to the ice, cutting her chin. Steuer carried her off the ice. The pair was forced to withdraw from the competition and Wötzel had to have stitches. They skated at the 1994 World Championships one month later, and finished fourth. In a humorous touch, after the program, Steuer carried Wötzel off the ice just as he had at the Olympics.

Wötzel/Steuer won the 1995 European Championships and the 1997 World Championships in Lausanne, Switzerland. Steuer underwent his fifth or sixth knee surgery in mid-1997. On December 8, 1997, a passing car's side window hit Steuer's arm, partly tearing ligaments in his right shoulder. Pain radiated to his neck and face and caused headaches but he continued to skate. Wötzel/Steuer won the silver medal at the Champions Series Final, held December 19–20, 1997 in Munich, Germany. When he caught her during a triple twist in the long program, Steuer felt a sharp pain that extended to his head. They stayed off the ice for the following three weeks. Wötzel/Steuer missed the 1998 European Championships as a result but returned in time for the 1998 Winter Olympics in Nagano, Japan, where they won the bronze medal. They then retired from competition and skated in shows and professional events.

In a 2006 interview, Wötzel said that their partnership was "hell" and she felt anxiety at the sight of Steuer.

Later career 
In autumn 2006, Wötzel participated in the TV show Dancing on Ice on the German channel RTL, partnered with boxer Sven Ottke.

Wötzel works as a skating coach in Australia. She started teaching at the Olympic Ice Rink in Oakleigh, Melbourne in 2008.

Programs

With Steuer

With Rauschenbach

Results

With Ingo Steuer 
GP: Champions Series (Grand Prix)

With Axel Rauschenbach

References

1973 births
Living people
Sportspeople from Chemnitz
German female pair skaters
World Figure Skating Championships medalists
European Figure Skating Championships medalists
Figure skaters at the 1992 Winter Olympics
Figure skaters at the 1994 Winter Olympics
Figure skaters at the 1998 Winter Olympics
Medalists at the 1998 Winter Olympics
Olympic bronze medalists for Germany
Olympic figure skaters of Germany
Olympic medalists in figure skating
Recipients of the Silver Laurel Leaf
People from Bezirk Karl-Marx-Stadt
German figure skating coaches
German emigrants to Australia